Harold Barling Town,  (June 13, 1924 – December 27, 1990) was a Canadian artist who worked in many different media, but is best known for his abstract paintings.  

He was a member of Painters Eleven, abstract artists in Toronto 1954-1960. Town coined the name of the group, which was based simply on the number of artists that were present the first meeting. 

He also worked as an illustrator, a profession he credited with imparting a sense of discipline that would last throughout his entire artistic career. 
His early illustrative appeared in magazines such as Maclean's and Mayfair.

Life and work
Harold Town was trained at Western Technical-Commercial School  and Ontario College of Art, both in Toronto. The Royal Ontario Museum gave him what he called a global horizon which influenced his commercial and abstract art. His early work also reflected his interest in Pablo Picasso and Willem de Kooning.

Gerta Moray in Harold Town: Life & Work described his collages as similar to his paintings, by juxtaposing textures and fragments to startle the viewer.

Town's work moved from a dark expressionist style to abstraction in vivid colours, exploring a range of styles and media, using artistic traditions from other cultures to reflect his own experience.

In the 1960s, Town developed colourful monotype prints which he called Single Autographic Prints, a phrase he never explained. These won him awards in Ljubljana, Yugoslavia and Santiago, Chile, where the prints were acquired by the Solomon Guggenheim Museum and the Museum of Modern Art.  Alfred Barr, then director of Museum of Modern Art, called Town one of the world's greatest printmakers. Roald Nasgaard describes these prints as being of great finesse and subtlety.

Honours
In 1956 and 1964, Town and others represented Canada at the Venice Biennale. He also exhibited at the São Paulo Art Biennial in 1957 (receiving the Arno Award) and 1961. He became an associate member of the Royal Canadian Academy of Arts in 1958.  York University granted him an honorary doctorate in 1966. He was made an Officer of the Order of Canada in 1968.

Town had retrospective exhibitions at the Art Gallery of Windsor in 1975 and the Art Gallery of Ontario in 1986.

In 1994, the Harold Town Conservation Area in Peterborough, Ontario was donated to Otonabee Conservation by Town’s estate.

Painters Eleven

In the late 1940s, Town joined Painters Eleven, but their early exhibitions were met with disdain. The Riverside Museum in New York hosted the Twentieth Annual Exhibition of American Abstract Artists with 'Painters Eleven' of Canada in 1956. A year later, American art critic Clement Greenberg paid a visit to Toronto. In the Canadian press, the group's most ardent supporters were Robert Fulford and Pearl McCarthy, art critic of the Globe and Mail.

Notes

Further reading
 Broad, Graham. "Art Shock in Toronto: Painters Eleven, The Shock of the New." The Beaver, Canada’s History Magazine Vol. 84:1 (2004).
 Burnett, David G. Town. Toronto: Art Gallery of Ontario, 1986. 
 Fulford, Robert. "Introduction." Magnificent Decade: The Art of Harold Town, 1955-1965. Toronto: The Moore Gallery, 1997.
Moray, Gerta. Harold Town: Life & Work. Toronto: Art Canada Institute, 2014. 
 Nasgaard, Roald. Abstract Painting in Canada. Vancouver: Douglas & McIntyre, 2008. 
 Withrow, William J. Contemporary Canadian Painting. Toronto: McClelland and Stewart, 1972. 
 Nowell, Iris. "Hot Breakfast For Sparrows: My Life With Harold Town," Toronto; Stoddart Publishing, 1992, 
 Nowell, Iris. "Painters Eleven: The Wild Ones of Canadian Art," Vancouver: Doublas & McIntyre, 2010.

External links
Robert Fulford's essay on Harold Town
CBC Radio interview with Harold Town
Harold Town at The Canadian Encyclopedia
Clara Thomas Archives and Special Collections, York University - Archival photographs of Harold Town from the Toronto Telegram fonds.
Official Harold Town website
Harold Town fonds (R5740) at Library and Archives Canada

20th-century Canadian painters
Canadian male painters
Canadian printmakers
Canadian abstract artists
Canadian illustrators
Canadian collage artists
1924 births
1990 deaths
Artists from Toronto
Members of the Royal Canadian Academy of Arts
Officers of the Order of Canada
20th-century printmakers
Canadian contemporary artists
20th-century Canadian male artists